The Independent Colleges & Universities of Florida (ICUF) is a voluntary association of 30 private colleges and universities in the U.S. state of Florida. Like the 12 public universities in Florida, all ICUF schools are accredited by the Southern Association of Colleges and Schools. The current president is Robert J. Boyd. ICUF institutions issue nearly one-third of college degrees at the baccalaureate level and above in Florida.

Members

References

External links
 

 
1956 establishments in Florida